Morbi is one of the 182 Legislative Assembly constituencies of Gujarat state in India. It is part of Morbi district. It is numbered as 65-Morbi.

List of segments
This assembly seat represents the following segments

 Maliya-Miyana Taluka
 Morbi Taluka (Part) Villages – Sokhda, Bahadurgadh, Nava Nagdavas, Piludi, Rapar, Aniyari, Jetpar, Vaghpar, Juna Nagdavas, Gungan, Gala, Sapar, Jasmatgadh, Chakampar, Zinkiyali, Jivapar Chakampar, Kerala, Haripar, Nava Sadulka, Ravapar Nadi, Juna Sadulka, Bela Rangpar, Rangpar, Sanala (Talaviya), Timbdi, Dharampur, Amreli, Mahendranagar, Madhapar, Bhadiyad, Morbi (M), Trajpar

Members of Legislative Assembly

Election results

2022

2020
A by-election was needed as the sitting MLA, Brijesh Merja, resigned from the assembly and his party. He won the by-election as the candidate for the BJP.

2017

2012

See also
 List of constituencies of the Gujarat Legislative Assembly
 Morbi district

References

External links
 

Assembly constituencies of Gujarat
Morbi district